Shun Tin may refer to:
 Shun Tin (constituency), a constituency in Kwun Tong District
 Shun Tin Estate, a public housing estate in Shun Lee, Hong Kong
 Shun Tin station, a proposed MTR station on the East Kowloon line